Turmalina is a municipality in the state of São Paulo in Brazil. The elevation is 467 m.

The municipality contains part of the  Acauã Ecological Station, a fully protected conservation unit created in 1974.

References

Municipalities in São Paulo (state)